Anna Chromy (18 July 1940 – 18 September 2021) was a painter and sculptor of Czech-German descent. At the end of World War II, Chromy's family was expelled from Bohemia to Vienna, Austria.  Her family did not have enough money for her to attend art school however, so only after she married and moved to Paris was it possible. She received her education at the École des Beaux-Arts. It was here she realised an interest in Salvador Dalí and other surrealists, and began using the soft colours of William Turner in her paintings.

A life-threatening accident in 1992 meant that Chromy was unable to paint for eight years. She turned her attention to sculpture using bronze and marble as her media.

Biography
Anna was born to a Czech mother and a German father on 18 July 1940, in Krumau, Czechoslovakia. Anna's childhood in Bohemia provided her with her first indulgence in art, and she was often fascinated with images of ancient palaces displaying sculptures, graphics and paintings. After World War II, at the age of five, Anna and her family were forced to leave Krumlov and move to Austria. While in Austria, the musical culture of Vienna and Salzburg made a lasting impression on Anna, and would eventually be the inspiration for many of her works of art. In 1970, Anna and her husband, Wolfgang, moved to Barbizon, France, which is southeast of Paris. Here, Anna was surrounded by artists who came from far and wide to paint the beautiful forests of Fontainebleau. While in Barbizon, Anna began to study at the Academy de la Grande Chaumire in Paris.

It was during her studies in Paris that Anna met her mentor, Salvador Dalí, who also became a personal friend. As his pupil, Dali inspired Anna's imagination and creativity with his personal style of art known as surrealism. Anna developed an appreciation of Dali's style, and her paintings drew from her admiration of Dali and other artists of surrealism such as Max Ernst, Rene Magritte. She did a charcoal of Dali and Gala titled "Homage Dali & Gala," and Dali's image appears in her 1981 oil painting, "The Boat of Cadaces."

Beginning in the 1980s, Anna's work began to be the image of many widely publicized events. In 1985, Anna created three sketches called the Faces of Peace for the United Nations Year of Peace in New York. Her painting, Man, Earth, Universe, which was Anna's interpretation of transcendence to a better world, became the official painting of the 1992 World's Fair, also known as EXPO 92, in Seville, Spain. In 1985, Chromy and her husband established a new home in Cap Martin, France, on the Côte d'Azur, where she and her husband enjoyed many years with their three dogs and several cats. In this villa, Anna had the room to display all her works of art, turning her home into her own exclusive museum. Anna found pleasure adding her own individuality to this villa. She painted a mural of angels on one of the ceilings and dancing figures across her wardrobe doors. She turned one of the rooms into a studio where she painted her "Last Supper." Today, Anna's sculpture, "Coat of Saint Martin", sits at the entrance of Cap Martin. 

Anna died on 18 September 2021 at the age of 81.

Studio
Anna Chromy has studios in Pietrasanta, Tuscany where she also has her bronze foundries, Fonderia Artistica Mariani and Massimo Del Chiaro. For her marble sculptures she worked at the studio of Massimo Galleni in Pietrasanta. In Carrara, she sculpted at Studio Michelangelo of Franko.

While living in Cap Martin, Anna began sculpting marble at the studio of Massimo Galleni in Pietrasanta and Carrara, Italy, as well as at Studio Michelangelo of Franko Barattini. In 2002, Anna's sculpture, "The Heart of the World," was presented to Pope John Paul II in St. Peter's Square in the Vatican. In 2008, Anna received the "Primo Michelangelo" which is the highest award for a sculptor in Italy. Never forgetting Austria's musical influence, Anna was the first sculptor to do the characters of Don Giovanni in life-size bronze. In 2000, Anna had her showing of her Don Giovanni and the Sound of Bronze Exhibition in Prague. This exhibition was an enormous success and brought her great exposure. Today, Anna's fountain of Czech musicians is located in Prague's Semovazni Square. Her sculpture, "The Cloak of Conscience," is located in the front entrance of the Stavovske Divadlo. In Prague, Anna has received several prestigious awards, including the Masaryk, Dali, and Kafka Awards. Anna's interest in Greek and Roman mythology influenced her to create sculptures such as "Europe" and "Olympic Spirit." All of Anna's sculptures of mythical figures were displayed on the front terrace of the National Archeological Museum in Athens, Greece.

In 2009, China invited Anna as the first foreign sculptor to join the Chinese Academy of Sculpture and her work is mainly perceived as a message of peace and harmony. Anna's sculpture, "Carmen," will be the showpiece of the new opera house in Guangzhou and her sculpture, "Sisyphus," has a place of honor in the Museum of Modern Art in Guangzhou. Also that year, Anna"s sculpture, Olivier d'Or, was presented by Albert II, Prince of Monaco, to the Nobel Peace Prize Winner, Elie Wiesel.

Anna has been sculpting for over twenty years and has created many astonishing sculptures that can be seen in several countries. One sculpture in particular, "The Cloak of Conscience", is by far Anna's most monumental sculpture; it is her legacy. In 2008, Anna presented a model of "The Cloak of Conscience" to Pope Benedict XVI in the Vatican to mark the creation of the Conscience Institute, an organization devoted to the development of the arts. "The Cloak of Conscience," a statue of an empty, draping cloak, whose true essence is hidden, has become Anna's motivation and inspiration. Anna has been sculpting this invisible hero standing against corruption, this symbol for hope, love and peace, from a 200-ton block of marble derived from Cave Michelangelo in Carrara.  An unwavering amount of strength, courage, and devotion to this profound sculpture has spanned over five years and is close to completion. Anna Chromy's other sculptures of the Cloak of Conscience can be seen at the National Archeological Museum in Athens, Foundation Ferrero, Foundation C'a la Ghironda, Bologna, Museo dei Bozzetti, Pietrasanta, Italy, in Austria at the Salzburg Cathedral, at Keitum Church, Sylt, Germany, and at the Grimaldi Palace, Principality of Monaco.

Conscience art

Chromy's best-known piece is the empty coat, known as The Cloak of Conscience, Piétà or Commendatore, located in Cathedral in Salzburg, Austria, Stavovske divadlo in Prague, National Archeological Museum in Athens and elsewhere.
Chromy has since transformed The Cloak into a chapel over four metres high, carved out of a block of white marble weighing 250 tons in the Cave Michelangelo in Carrara.

Other important works include the Olympic Spirit, to be placed in front of the new library in Shanghai; and Europe, a contemporary reinterpretation of the old myth, to be placed at the European institutions. In 2009 her “Olivier d’Or” was presented by Albert II, Prince of Monaco to Nobel Peace Prize winner, Elie Wiesel. In 2008 she presented a model of The Cloak of Conscience to Pope Benedict XVI at Saint Peters in Rome to mark the creation of the Conscience Institute.

Olympic sculptures

In 2012 at the London Olympic Games, Chromy's Olympic Spirit was positioned in the Olympic Village, the home of the athletes for the duration of the games. It was provided as a gift from Lord Moynihan, Chairman of the British Olympic Association, and a compliment to the sportsmen and women competing at the Games. Some of them posed next to it to have their photograph taken, including Matthew Mitcham who climbed to the top of it for his photo. Ulysses, another of the Olympic collection, was positioned in the harbour of Monaco in 2011, and Sisyphus has been positioned at the University of Pisa.

Public sculptures

Chromy draws inspiration from music, opera in particular; classic dance; and the ancient myths. Her paintings contain references to the Vienna School of Fantastic Realism and other Central European artists. Her colours, sometimes used also on sculptures, have a subtle Turner-like touch.  She is said to be a quintessential European.

Exhibitions
Don Giovanni and the Sound of Bronze (2000) in Prague (Czech Republic)
Il Canto di Orfeo (2004) Pietrasanta (Italy)
Europe (2005) Place Vendôme, Paris (France)
Mythos Revisited (2007), National Archeological Museum, Athens (Greece)
Dream of the East (2009), Beijing (China)
Myths of the Mediterranean (2011), St. Tropez (France)
Spiritus Mundi (2012), Foshan (China)

Chromy Awards
The Chromy awards were conceived by Anna Chromy following her study and practice of conscience art. The first award ceremony, in 2013, honoured those individuals who were nominated for their diligence and service to saving humankind or the Earth, or both, in the work they do. The first nominees included people like Bill Gates, Desmond Tutu, Aung San Suu Kyi and Gene Sharp. Following completion of The Cloak of Conscience, and on further reflection of her life's work, Chromy painted a series of oils on canvas in 2012 called Chromology. These were created to reflect the emotion, purpose and meaning of those who might win a Chromy award. These paintings were later added to, and the entire collection became Chromatology.

Earlier paintings

In China
Anna Chromy has gathered interest in China since 1995 when she was honorary guest at the Guangzhou-art-fair. In the time since then her popularity has grown in the region. In December 2011, at her exhibition in Foshan, Qiao Hua, Director of the Grandfather Art Gallery, formalised her popularity when he said her works have won the favour of collectors in China. She has been invited to exhibit her entire collection for the first time at the National Museum of China, on Tiananmen Square in Beijing.  In June 2012, during the placement of Chromy's Olympic Spirit in the National Academy of Sculpture in Beijing, Wu Weishan, Director of the Academy appointed Anna Chromy Honorary Fellow in the National Academy.

References

External links 

 

1940 births
2021 deaths
Czech sculptors
Czech women sculptors
People from Český Krumlov
École des Beaux-Arts alumni
Czech women painters
21st-century Czech women artists
Czech people of German descent